The naval stores industry collects, processes, and markets forest products refined from the oleoresin of the slash pine and longleaf pine trees (genus Pinus). The industry was associated with the maintenance of the wooden ships and sailing tackle of pre-20th century navies, which were caulked and waterproofed using the pitch (a product made with tar) of the pine tree.

History

With the demise of wooden ships, those uses of pine resin ended, but the industry remained vigorous as new products created new markets. First extensively described by Frederick Law Olmsted in his book A Journey in the Seaboard Slave States (1856), the naval stores industry was one of the economic mainstays of the southeastern United States until the late 20th century. Despite a rapid decline of the gum naval stores industry in the last quarter of the 20th century, a few places in the southeastern United States still rely on it as a major part of their livelihood.

Gum naval stores cultivation refers to the labor-intensive method of extracting pine resin from the trees (the raw gum). The method of collection—tapping the trees—vaguely resembles that used on a rubber plantation or in a maple sugar grove.  However, instead of preparing the tree to receive a pipe or tap, the tree is gashed with an inch-wide curved blade, called a "hack," to remove all of the bark down through the cambium layer. An angled piece of galvanized tin is then placed below the eight-inch-long, one-inch-wide gash (also known as "the streak") to direct the oozing sap into a quart-sized rectangular cup fixed to the tree. Each new "streak" is put onto the tree above the preceding one, and gradually a vertical "cat face" more than thirty inches in height is formed. Through the mid-twentieth century, a "puller," a type of hack that had a long handle, was used to extend the streak up the tree to a height of more than seven feet.

Once, large operators, known as "factors," controlled huge tracts of forests, some in the hundreds of thousands of acres, which they leased to "operators," and also advanced them capital, usually in the form of tools and other equipment and goods with which to operate. The operators satisfied their debt to the factors by returning the produce, barrels of resin. The name "Factors Walk" on the riverfront in Savannah, Georgia, commemorates an area on the Savannah River harbor where thousands of barrels of produce were collected for transshipment. Between 1880 and 1920, Savannah was the largest port for naval stores products and continued to set the world price of naval stores until 1950.

Basic processes

The basic raw material, pine resin, once collected, is converted into two major products — rosin and turpentine. For many years rosin and turpentine were used unprocessed in common household products such as soap, paper, paint, and varnish. Today most rosin is altered to be used in a wide range of products that includes paper sizing, surface coatings, adhesives, printing inks, and rubber compounds. Turpentine, like rosin, has become a versatile material exploited to develop uses in fragrances, flavors, vitamins, household cleaning products, medicines, and polyterpene resin.

Industry today

Because of a shortage of workers willing to perform the heavy manual labor involved in the streaking of many acres of trees and in collecting the resin tree by tree as well, the gum naval stores industry entered a period of steep decline beginning in the 1960s. As of 2001, only one large-scale facility (begun as Filtered Rosin Products) in Baxley, Georgia, continued in operation, serving the remaining naval stores producers in the surrounding area. Gradually, the method of tapping trees to obtain naval stores products has become overshadowed by industries which yield these products as byproducts of other operations.

See also
 McCranie's Turpentine Still
 Non-timber forest product

References 
Notes

Bibliography
 Earley, Lawrence S. (2004) Looking for Longleaf, The Fall and Rise of an American Forest.  Chapel Hill, NC: University of North Carolina Press.  
 Olmsted, Frederick Law (1862) The Cotton Kingdom: A Traveller's Observations on Cotton and Slavery in the American Slave States : Based upon Three Former Volumes of Journeys and Investigations, edited with an introduction by Arthur Meier Schlesinger, 1953, reissued 1996.  New York:  Da Capo Press  
 Outland, Robert B. III. (2004) Tapping the Pines: The Naval Stores Industry in the American South.  Baton Rouge, LA:  Louisiana State University Press 

Shipbuilding
Maritime history
Forestry
Forest history
Industries (economics)
Forest products